Volodymyr Oleksandrovych Kaplychnyi (Russian: Владимир Александрович Капличный; 26 February 1944 – 19 April 2004) was a Ukrainian association football defender.

During his career he played for FC Dynamo Khmelnitsky (1962–1963), SKA Lviv (1964–1965) and PFC CSKA Moscow (1966–75). He earned 62 caps for the USSR national football team, and participated in UEFA Euro 1968, the 1970 FIFA World Cup, and UEFA Euro 1972. He also earned a bronze medal at the 1972 Olympics.

References

External links
Profile (in Russian)

1944 births
2004 deaths
People from Kamianets-Podilskyi
Ukrainian footballers
Jewish footballers
Soviet footballers
Soviet Union international footballers
UEFA Euro 1968 players
1970 FIFA World Cup players
UEFA Euro 1972 players
FC Podillya Khmelnytskyi players
SKA Lviv players
PFC CSKA Moscow players
Olympic footballers of the Soviet Union
Footballers at the 1972 Summer Olympics
Olympic bronze medalists for the Soviet Union
Jewish Ukrainian sportspeople
Soviet Jews
SKA Lviv managers
SC Odesa managers
Olympic medalists in football
Medalists at the 1972 Summer Olympics
Association football defenders
Ukrainian football managers
Sportspeople from Khmelnytskyi Oblast